Not All Heroes Wear Capes (stylized in all caps) is the debut studio album by American record producer Metro Boomin. It was released on by Boominati Worldwide and Republic Records on November 2, 2018. The album features guest appearances from Gucci Mane, Travis Scott, 21 Savage, Swae Lee, Gunna, Young Thug, Wizkid, J. Balvin, Offset, Kodak Black, and Drake. The deluxe edition of the album was released, consisting of the instrumental versions of all songs from the standard edition on November 6, 2018. The album is the first part of a trilogy, with the second part being its sequel, Metro's second studio album, Heroes & Villains, which was released on December 2, 2022.

Background
In April 2018, Metro appeared to announce his "retirement" from music production on his Instagram page, changing his bio to "Retired record producer/DJ." However, he had garnered production credits on other albums that were released later that year.

Release and promotion
On June 23, 2017, Metro released the lead single of the album, "No Complaints", which features American rapper Offset and Canadian rapper Drake. On October 26, 2018, multiple billboards appeared in Atlanta and New York depicting Metro Boomin as a "missing person". It was later revealed to be a teaser for the new full-length project Not All Heroes Wear Capes, cryptically teased as a solo album. The cover and track list were unveiled by 21 Savage on his Instagram page. It was then announced on October 31, 2018. On January 29, 2019, "Space Cadet", which features American rapper Gunna, was released to rhythmic contemporary radio on January 29, 2019, as the album's second single.

Critical reception

Not All Heroes Wear Capes received positive reviews from music critics. Alphonse Pierre of Pitchfork described Not All Heroes Wear Capes as "a high-profile guest-filled album that builds on and creates a bigger version of the dark, hard-hitting production that has turned Metro into rap’s definitive producer of the last five years." Pierre praised the production and performances of the featured artists, concluding that the album "doesn’t feel like the typical producer album, filled with mixtape leftovers and owed favors. This is Metro Boomin laying the groundwork for his next phase, which at times feels like it could be film scores. When you’ve done it all at 25 years old, some may lose the motivation, but Metro seems ready to keep going, continuing to define the new sound of hip-hop." Marcus Blackwell of HipHopDX complimented the cohesiveness of the album, adding that there is "a cinematic feel throughout that places the artists in their appropriate pockets." Online hip hop publication HotNewHipHop concluded: "With the power to transcend his post-trap aesthetic in full-display, Metro Boomin is gearing up for the most arduous creative phase of his career. NAHWC is a memorable showcase if you wade through the more tenable parts and create your own setlist. For Metro Boomin the distance between the 1st rung he currently occupies, and the rest of the ladder is so cavernous, he surely has all the time in the World to find his autonomy." Thomas Hobbs from Highsnobiety describes Metro Boomin's work in Not All Heroes Wear Capes as a feeling "both minimalist and maximalist at the same time, with Metro creating vast compositions out of what feels like fairly traditional rap production techniques", with praises to the album as "consistently engaging".

Commercial performance
Not All Heroes Wear Capes debuted at number one on the US Billboard 200 with 99,000 album-equivalent units, making it Metro Boomin's first US number-one album. The album dropped to the number eight in its second week, earning an additional 52,000 album-equivalent units. The album debuted at 16 on the UK Album Charts.

Following the release of Not All Heroes Wear Capes, seven songs from the album debuted on the Billboard Hot 100, including the 21 Savage-assisted track "Don't Come Out the House", which charted at number 38, becoming the highest-charting song from the album.

Track listing

Notes
  signifies an additional producer.
 "10AM / Save the World" features additional vocals by Kevin Lemons and Higher Calling.
 "Overdue" features additional vocals by 21 Savage.
 "Space Cadet" features additional vocals by Travis Scott.
 "Only You" features background vocals by Allen Ritter.
 "Overdue" transitions into "Don't Come Out the House".
 "Only 1 (Interlude)" transitions into "Lesbian".

Sample credits
 "10AM / Save the World" contains a sample from "Save the World", written by Gladys Givens and performed by The Loving Sisters.
 "Overdue" contains a sample from "Anthonio (Berlin Breakdown Version)", written by Annie Strand, Hannah Robinson, and Richard Phillips, and performed by Annie.
 "10 Freaky Girls" contains a sample from "Are You the Woman", written by Michael Jones and performed by Kashif and Whitney Houston.
 "Borrowed Love" contains a sample from "After Laughter (Comes Tears)", written by Mary Cross and Johnnie Frierson, and performed by Wendy Rene.
 "No More" contains a sample from "Synopsis One: In the Ghetto / God Save the World", written by Dale Warren and performed by 24-Carat Black.

Personnel

Performance
 Metro Boomin – primary artist
 Gucci Mane – featured artist 
 Travis Scott – featured artist , vocals 
 21 Savage – featured artist , additional vocals 
 Swae Lee – featured artist 
 Gunna – featured artist 
 Young Thug – featured artist 
 Wizkid – featured artist 
 Offset – featured artist 
 J Balvin – primary artist 
 Kodak Black – featured artist 
 Drake – featured artist 
 Kevin Lemons and Higher Calling – vocals 
 Allen Ritter – background vocals 

Instrumentation
 Jeff Basko – guitar 
 Peter Lee Johnson – strings , keyboards 
 Milan Beker – keyboards 
 Allen Ritter – keyboards 
 Siraaj Rhett – horn 
 Jeff Babko – keyboards 
 Hudson Buckley – bass guitar 
 Mike McTaggart – guitar 
 Timothy Loo – conductor , strings conductor 
 Sean O'Neil – guitar 

Production
 Metro Boomin – executive production, production 
 Dre Moon – production 
 Prince 85 – production 
 Tay Keith – production 
 Allen Ritter – production , additional production 
 Wheezy – production 
 Milan Beker – additional production 
 Southside – production 

Technical
 Metro Boomin – programming 
 Dre Moon – programming 
 Prince 85 – programming 
 Metro Boominati – programming 
 Tay Keith – programming 
 Allen Ritter – programming 
 Wheezy – programming 
 Southside – programming 
 Ethan Stevens – mixing , recording engineering 
 Turnmeup Josh – recording engineering 
 Mac Attison – recording engineering

Charts

Weekly charts

Year-end charts

Certifications

References

2018 debut albums
Metro Boomin albums
Republic Records albums
Albums produced by Metro Boomin
Albums produced by Tay Keith